Pénjamo ( or Penxamo 'place of ahuehuetes or sabinos'; Cradle of Hidalgo) is the seat of Pénjamo municipality, one of 46 municipalities of Guanajuato, Mexico. It was cofounded in 1549 by Guamares, Purépechas, and Otomis prior to the outbreak of the Chichimeca war.  

The city is located to the southwest of the condition, and account with a total of 164,261.27 hectares of surface that correspond to 5.20% of the state total. It borders on the municipalities of Abasolo, Cuerámaro, Manuel Doblado de Guanajuato, and is beside the states of Jalisco and Michoacán. According to the Census of the year 2000 the total population was 144,426 inhabitants in total in the municipality, in spite of this in the last census realized in the year 2010,  where the total population of the City was near 41,000, of which the majority devotes itself to the services, trade, in measure to the industry and to the tourist services. The motto of the city is a " M. Hidalgo Cradle ", because in the year of 1753 born in the Hacienda of Corralejo near to the city the Father of the Mexican Mother land, Miguel Hidalgo y Costilla.

Likewise it was approved by the Congress of Union of the United Mexican States, Penjamo's Metropolitan Zone Penjamo - La Piedad which there is placed in the conditions Mexican's states of Guanajuato and Michoacan. The zone a population registers, according to the count 2005 of the INEGI [1] of 229,289 inhabitants. The Urban Delegation Santa Ana Pacueco, belonging to Penjamo's City, is joined to La Piedad, Michoacan and only they are divided by the river Lerma though they are joined by 7 bridges (Hatches, Big River, Quota, Michoacán, Guanajuato, Cabadas and Them Dwell). For which both cities share needs and common problems, and they search of is Metropolitan Zone.

Historical prominent figures 
 Don Miguel Hidalgo y Costilla. - In the year of 1753 was born in this city, in the Estate of Corralejo Liberating of Mexico, The Father of the Motherland. Son of Ana Maria Gallaga and Cristobal Hidalgo, which contracted nuptials in the Principal Parish of City of Penjamo, Gto. dedicated to Asis's San Francisco. The father of Nobleman fungió as administrator of Corralejo's Hacienda, for Gentlemanly what it was not born in a home of low resources. In the year of 1810, it rose up in arms proclaiming the independence and abolishing the slavery, in the so-called Shout of Dolores. The Hidalago's independence campaign for the New Spain lasted until the year of 1811, year in the one that was imprisoned and shot in Chihuahua's city in the condition of the same name. His head was exhibited for years after his death in Granaditas's Public granary, in Guanajuato's city, granary that he itself months behind had taken killing the Spanish who were sheltering in the place refusing to deliver the city and Guanajuato's intendency, after the Independence was triumphing in the year of 1821, recognizing it Spain across the signature of the last Viceroy Juan O`Donoju of the Declaration of Independence of the Mexican Empire; The remains of Hidalgo and of other independence heroes who hung of the public granary joined, and in the year of 1910 they moved to the column of the Independence in Mexico City D.f, newly inaugurated by the centenary of the independence for the president at the time Porfirio Días, place that up to nowadays there rest the remains of Hidalgo and other insurgents.
 Joaquín Pardavé. - Is the place of birth of the great cinematographic and theatrical Director, Composer and Actor. Born in Penjamo's city, in the year of 1900. In spite of taking root principally in his professional life in Mexico City, often one liked to give the delight of returning to his natal land which was adoring, it tries it is the song of world reputation, called Penjamo, which was composed by the actor for his land. Interpreted later by Pedro Infante. He died of a cerebral spillage on July 20, 1955, in the Mexico City. In his honor a municipal audience, as well as a central avenue and a lounge of a famous tequilera of Penjamo's city, they take the name of actor.
 Francisco Javier Mina . - In the Fort of the Remedios (part of Penjamo's Mountains) was shot the insurgent " El Mozo ", during the war of Independence of the United Mexican States.
 Antonio Gómez Rodríguez. - Creator of the National Shield, lived in the city and some authors believe that in the same one the shield of the nation was designed.
 Luis Navarro Origel. - Was one of the most relevant participants of the social Mexican war known as "Cristeros" in the second decade of the 20th century, was born in Penjamo's city and was a municipal president in Penjamo.
 Ignacio Vázquez Torres. - Attorney of profession and Political, was a member of the PRI, and deputy for the same party in several occasions.

Location 
Penjamo's city, municipal head-board, is located to the 101° 42 ' 22 " of length to the west of the Meridian of Greenwich and to the 20° 25 ' 44 " north latitude, his height on the level of the sea is 1,700 meters approximately and in some places like Penjamo's Saw it reaches 2400 meters on the level of the sea.

It comes near to the city for the federal road 90, which he communicates to Irapuato's city with the city of Guadalajara, in the condition of Straw hat. It is located to approximately 40 minutes of Irapuato's city.

A great part of the city, one agrees on the skirts of Penjamo's Mountains, other one divides between that the zone is center, one finds in a zone wave, whereas other one departs from the city one agrees in hills and few part in flat zone, for what some Penjamo's streets are very high whereas very linear others.

History 
The territory that nowadays occupies the City and Penjamo Municipality took was first settled by the Guachichil and Purépechas. The most representative sample of these cultures is Plazuelas's Archaeological Zone, nowadays the most important of the archaeological zones of the condition.

The city and the municipality were founded on November 12, 1542 by the name of Penxamo's San Francisco (in tarasco the name was Penlamu " place of sabinos or ahuehuetes ") by virtue of the bond sent by the Spanish king Carlos V, in which she was authorized the captain Diego Tomás de Jesuchihua to realize.

On May 8, 1753, one gives the birth of the Father of the Mother land, Miguel Hidalgo in the ex—hacienda of Corralejo belonging to Penjamo's jurisdiction. Today the ex-estate is known as Corralejo Hidalgo.

The city was the scenario of the war of inpedencia of mexcico, so much for the Spanish Francisco Javier Mina shot in Penjamo's Saw in this municipality and Albino García who in August, 1811 freed a new combat against the realists in Penjamo, against a division ordered by Pedro Moreno, and formed by San Luis' dragoons of the Peace and the lancers' body. In this combat they attacked Penjamo's city it to plunder and to intimidate Jose Maria of the Trinidad Hidaldo y Costilla, brother of the priest Michael Hidalgo, subdelegate of the viceregal government (1759) this personage studied Medicine, without finishing the career but he was recovering. He administered the Estate when his father died and was recovering the Headquarters of Weapon in Penjamo, to the service of the viceregal government and in opposition to the Insurgents.

In the year of 1815 the population is inflamed, remaining completely destroyed.
The works of rebuilding begin for the year of 1830.
On May 22, 1857, the population acquires the title of villa, and is raised to the category of city in the year of 1906 by decree of the governor Licenciado Joaquín Obregón Gonzalez. Nowadays the city counts with near 40,000 inhabitants.

The most relevant fact that guards the history of this city is Miguel Hidalgo's birth, is the Father of the Mexican Mother land, in the year of 1753 in Corralejo's Estate.
The territory Penjamense was the site of Francisco Xavier Mina's battles, during the war of independence. And this insurgent was shot in Penjamo's Saw, in the zone of the Fort of the Remedies.

Curious information: During the second world war, in the space in which Mexico enters combat, the lights of the city were going out to avoid bombardments to the same one.

City seal 
The seal of the city features an Ahuehuete tree, underneath which there is written the year of the city's foundation, 1542. Beneath that is a drawing of the Cerro Grande (the Grand Hill), with a blue sky and a gilded, five-pointed star, underneath the year that Miguel Hidalgo was born, 1753. On top the shield is written 'Cradle of Hidalgo, San Francisco de Penxamo,' and around the shield is the Latin motto, Nobilis, Fidilis, Fortis, (noble, faithful, strong.)

Change 
The municipal, state and federal governments realize the importance of tourism to the city; the historical center of the city has been recreated, promoting the archaeological zone, whilst shops and commercial buildings have improved and urbanized several zones of the city.
This way so also, it has been a question of improving the urban aspect, and of the ecological zones. It has been achieved to do to Corralejo's ex-estate a tourist point for thousands of travelers who want to know the Nobleman's cradle, or simply people who wants to prove his tequilas of international height. If even it is absent much for doing the city has given a great favorable change.
The infrastructure of the city in road links has improved notably with the urbanization of avenues, street and boulevards. The current head office of buses gives a better sight to the city and a better appearance to the inhabitants and visitors who manage in the system of foreign trucks.
In educational matter the city relies on 2 public universities, that they are the UNIDEG (Interactive University and distantly of Guanajuato Plantel's State Penjamo) and the UPG or UPP (Guanajuato's Technical University campus Penjamo, Penjamo's Technical University), this one finalizes considered the maximum university of the city, and one of the recognized mas of the region. As well as also diverse schools of average top education and bivalent baccalaureates since they are the CECyTEG and CONALEP, nurseries that in case of them the second school possesses the ISO validation, and in the first case the nursery CECyTEG he is considered to be one of the best of the federal entity. Guanajuato's University, it has presence in the city, so it counts with preparatory official or School of Average Top Level (ENMS) belonging to the maximum university of the condition, in the above-mentioned facilities the careers are given in common trunk of several careers of engineering of the above-mentioned University.
In health the citizenship has access to one of the best hospitals of the region, on having counted the city with the Regional Hospital of the Southwest, like that also as clinic of the ISSSTE, clinic of the IMSS, and a Community Hospital, more a great range of particular high-level Hospitals inside the city. 
This one in process the creation of a Heliport, and a module of command of Public Security for the region Southwest.
In public and commercial spaces the city possesses a range of zones of scattering between squares, gardens, parks or sports units distributed in the city, and in creation more. This way also as an impulse to the trade with the attraction of shops of self-service and stores of clothes and footwear of national prestige of great size in the city, giving this way one more attraction for the visitors of the city and his inhabitants. 
Nowadays the city relies on two TV Channel, one of own transmission of the city that it transmits 24 hours, and the second one that per beginning transmits only for scanty hours.
The city shapes the Metropolitan Zone Penjamo - La Piedad, which will attract multimillionaire investments to the zone, and that it includes more of 229mil inhabitants.

Tourist attractions 
Penjamo city: Penjamo is by itself a touristic center. By having commercial stores, restaurants, coffee shops, parks, parish churches, and buildings that could be consider real architecture jewels such as the market-place located in the city's downtown, or, Catholic temples such as the Parish of Saint Francis of Assisi (San Francisco de Asis), Parish of Our Lady of Los Remedios, Temple of San Antonio of Padua, Municipal Palace, House of the Culture. In addition large green areas can be found in the city's environs such as Magellan and Churipitzeo. Also, the City offers to the travelers various lodging options which fit all traveler's budgets and preferences. The City is part of the Route 2010 as part of the bicentennial celebration of the Independence War and centennial of the Mexican Revolution. The Route 2010 comprehends the cities that participated in the historical events that took place during the Independence and the Revolution Wars.
Corralejo: Cradle of Don Miguel Hidalgo y Costilla, Father of the Mother land. The former estate and the monuments that exist there today are an excellent to visit and to enjoy the traditional festivities during the first week of May, when the City celebrates Don Miguel Hidalgo's birthday.
Plazuelas: archaeological Zone (the most important of the condition), where in the spring entry pre-Hispanic dances and events are realized in the esplanade of the pyramids. It possesses also a museum where the pieces found in the place show themselves. Excellent site for a weekend, since near there, there happens a river of blue very clean water - it is necessary to respect the fauna and existing flora and not leave garbage nor provoke fires-. There is road paved almost up to the pyramids and exists parking and guides to make the tour pleasant, as well as the weekends are existed by sale of typical food of the region and the whole week sale of recollections and crafts.
Penjamo's Mountains: It is a natural area in route to there be declared natural protected zone consisted of impressive cannons, mounts and hills, has been a place of passages of the history of Mexico, in the war of independence there is shot the insurgent Francisco Javier Mina in the zone known as Fort of the Remedies, the entry to the place known as the booth, is the limit of Penjamo's municipality as Cuerámaro's municipality, since this saw spreads over several municipalities, but predominantly for Penjamo. In the site they find ruins of former constructions in the vegetation, a river of crystalline water and impressive rocks. It is an excellent site for the extreme sports and to encamp.
The Fair of May: better known as " Holidays of May ", they are carried out last days of April up to the first third of May of every year, with the invitation of varied artists of national and international height, of free access to the fair and the majority of the spectacles of the artists who appear. Ill-mannered person exists commercial, cattle, like that exhibition also like “jaripeos”, “tardeadas”, spectacles in the “place of toros”,  in the fence, and parallel feasts exist in the Urban Delegation Santa Ana and in Corralejo's Estate, where there realizes the principal event of the festivity, the commemoration of Don Michael Hidalgo's birthday and Rib on May 8, 1753, with presence of municipal, state and federal authorities, simultaneously that military.
Cultural Week of the Foundation: He understands several day that in general they begin from November 6 and reach 13 of the same month, in which they are commemorated the day of the foundation of the City, which was provoked, dates more near, on November 12, 1542. In these days they are; exhibitions of Photos of the City, this way also like of ancient vehicles, theatrical, musical works, the parade of the 12th, exhibition of pyrotechnic games the same day in the night, spectacles of motocross, artistic international presentations, Jaripeo, between other present activities in the city.

References

External links 

 Website about the city
 Tour by Mexico's page
 Pénjamo's entry on the Enciclopedia de los Municipios de México
 Pénjamo's official page, currently under construction
 Escuela Preparatoria de Pénjamo

Populated places in Guanajuato
Populated places established in 1542
Municipalities of Guanajuato
1542 establishments in New Spain